Stephanopodium longipedicellatum is a species of plant in the Dichapetalaceae family. It is endemic to Ecuador.  Its natural habitat is subtropical or tropical moist montane forests.

References

Flora of Ecuador
Vulnerable plants
longipedicellatum
Taxonomy articles created by Polbot